In Greek mythology, Charon or Kharon is a psychopomp, the ferryman of Hades, the Greek underworld. He carries the souls of those who have been given funeral rites across the rivers Acheron and Styx, which separate the worlds of the living and the dead. Archaeology confirms that, in some burials, low-value coins were placed in, on, or near the mouth of the deceased, or next to the cremation urn containing their ashes. This has been taken to confirm that at least some aspects of Charon's mytheme are reflected in some Greek and Roman funeral practices, or else the coins function as a viaticum for the soul's journey. In Virgil's epic poem, Aeneid, the dead who could not pay the fee, and those who had received no funeral rites, had to wander the near shores of the Styx for one hundred years before they were allowed to cross the river.

Some mortals, heroes, and demigods were said to have descended to the underworld and returned from it as living beings. This journey is known as catabasis, and those who undergo it may acquire partial or full immortality, either through persuasion or payment of another, more exceptional fee. To pay for his entry to Hades as a living mortal, Virgil's Aeneas gives Charon the Golden Bough.

Name origins
The word may be a euphemism for death. Flashing eyes may indicate the anger or irascibility of Charon as he is often characterized in literature, but the etymology is not certain. The ancient historian Diodorus Siculus thought that the ferryman and his name had been imported from Egypt. Charon is first attested in the now fragmentary Greek epic poem Minyas, which includes a description of a descent to the underworld and possibly dates back to the 6th century BC.

Appearance and demeanor

Charon is depicted in the art of ancient Greece. Attic funerary vases of the 5th and 4th centuries BC are often decorated with scenes of the dead boarding Charon's boat. On the earlier such vases, he looks like a rough, unkempt Athenian seaman dressed in reddish-brown, holding his ferryman's pole in his right hand and using his left hand to receive the deceased. Hermes sometimes stands by in his role as psychopomp. On later vases, Charon is given a more "kindly and refined" demeanor.

In the 1st century BC, the Roman poet Virgil describes Charon, manning his rust-colored skiff, in the course of Aeneas's descent to the underworld (Aeneid, Book 6), after the Cumaean Sibyl has directed the hero to the golden bough that will allow him to return to the world of the living:
There Charon stands, who rules the dreary coast –A sordid god: down from his hairy chinA length of beard descends, uncombed, unclean;His eyes, like hollow furnaces on fire;A girdle, foul with grease, binds his obscene attire.

Other Latin authors also describe Charon, among them Seneca in his tragedy Hercules Furens, where Charon is described in verses 762–777 as an old man clad in foul garb, with haggard cheeks and an unkempt beard, a fierce ferryman who guides his craft with a long pole. When the boatman tells Heracles to halt, the Greek hero uses his strength to gain passage, overpowering Charon with the boatman's own pole.

In the second century, Lucian employed Charon as a figure in his Dialogues of the Dead, most notably in Parts 4 and 10 ("Hermes and Charon" and "Charon and Hermes").

In the 14th century, Dante Alighieri described Charon in his Divine Comedy, drawing from Virgil's depiction in Aeneid 6. Charon is the first named mythological character Dante meets in the underworld, in Canto III of the Inferno. Dante depicts him as having eyes of fire. Elsewhere, Charon appears as a mean-spirited and gaunt old man or as a winged demon wielding a double hammer, although Michelangelo's interpretation, influenced by Dante's depiction in the Inferno, shows him with an oar over his shoulder, ready to beat those who delay ("batte col remo qualunque s'adagia", Inferno 3, verse 111). In modern times, he is commonly depicted as a living skeleton in a cowl, much like the Grim Reaper. The French artist, Gustave Dore, depicted Charon in two of his illustrations for Dante's Divine Comedy. The Flemish painter, Joachim Patinir, depicted Charon in his Crossing the River Styx. And the Spanish painter, Jose Benlliure y Gil, portrayed Charon in his La Barca de Caronte.

The Acheron and the Styx

Most accounts, including Pausanias (10.28) and later Dante's Inferno (3.78), associate Charon with the swamps of the river Acheron. Ancient Greek literary sources – such as Pindar, Aeschylus, Euripides, Plato, and Callimachus – also place Charon on the Acheron. Roman poets, including Propertius, Ovid, and Statius, name the river as the Styx, perhaps following the geography of Virgil's underworld in the Aeneid, where Charon is associated with both rivers.

In astronomy
Charon, the largest moon of the dwarf planet Pluto, is named after him.

In paleontology
The hadrosaurid Charonosaurus is named in Charon's honor because it was found along the banks of the Amur River in the Far East.

See also
 Charun – an Etruscan counterpart to Charon
 Coins for the dead
 Isle of the Dead – a painting by Swiss Symbolist artist Arnold Böcklin 
 Manannán mac Lir – Ferryman from Irish mythology
 Manunggul Jar – Early depiction similar figure on burial jar from Tabon Caves on Palawan
 Phlegyas – a Greek king seen ferrying Dante and Virgil across the Styx in Inferno (Dante)
 Urshanabi – Ferryman from Mesopotamian mythology

References

Sources
 Bzinkowski, Michal (2017). Masks of Charos in Modern Greek Demotic Songs: Sources, Representations, and Context. Krakow: Jagiellonian University Press. .
 Smith, William (1873). "Charon". Dictionary of Greek and Roman Biography and Mythology. London.

External links 

 The Theoi Project, "KHARON" 
 Images of Charon in the Warburg Institute Iconographic Database 

Greek death gods
Greek underworld
Psychopomps
Characters in Book VI of the Aeneid
Metamorphoses characters
Chthonic beings